Whitewater High School is a public secondary school in Fayetteville, Georgia, United States. It serves  grades 9-12 for the Fayette County School System.

Academics
Whitewater has been accredited by Cognia, or its predecessors, since 2003. The school was ranked 1,758th nationally, 42nd for Georgia and 3rd for Fayette County in the 2020 U.S. News & World Reports annual ranking of high schools.

Demographics
The demographic breakdown of the 1,428 students enrolled for 2018-19 was:
Male - 50.8%
Female - 49.2%
Native American/Alaskan - >0.1%
Asian - 3.4%
Black - 20.3%
Hispanic - 8.1%
Native Hawaiian/Pacific islanders - 0.1%
White - 62.6%
Multiracial - 5.5%
17.9% of the students were eligible for free or reduced-cost lunch.

Notable alumni
Kyle Dugger, National Football League (NFL) safety

References

External links
 

Public high schools in Georgia (U.S. state)
Schools in Fayette County, Georgia